Doctor Bello is a 2013 Nigerian adventure drama film directed by Tony Abulu starring Isaiah Washington, Vivica A. Fox, Jimmy Jean-Louis, Genevieve Nnaji, Stephanie Okereke, Justus Esiri, Ebbe Bassey and Jon Freda.

Cast
Isaiah Washington
Vivica A. Fox
Jimmy Jean-Louis 
Genevieve Nnaji
Stephanie Okereke
Justus Esiri
Ebbe Bassey
Jon Freda
Bern Cohen
Victor Browne
Andrea Leigh
Linda Perhach
Evan Brinkman
Femi Brainard
Jide Kosoko
Olumide Bakare
Racheal Oniga

See also
 List of Nigerian films of 2013

References

External links
 
 

2013 films
English-language Nigerian films
2010s adventure drama films
Nigerian adventure drama films
Films set in Ondo
Films shot in Ondo
Films set in the United States
Films shot in the United States
American adventure drama films
2013 drama films
2010s English-language films
2010s American films